Kohtla-Järve is a city and municipality in northeastern Estonia, founded in 1924 and incorporated as a town in 1946. The city is highly industrial, and is both a processor of oil shales and is a large producer of various petrochemical products. During the 1944–1991 Soviet occupation, large numbers of immigrant workers from Russia and other parts of the former USSR were brought in to populate the rapidly growing city. The population in the Kohtla-Järve area which had been, as of 1934 census, over 90% ethnic Estonian, became overwhelmingly non-Estonian in the second half of the 20th century. According to more recent data (as of 2006) 21% of the city's population are ethnic Estonians; most of the rest are Russians. Kohtla-Järve is the fifth-largest city in Estonia in terms of population.

Kohtla-Järve is unusual among the municipalities of Estonia due to its territory being made of several discontiguous parts. The two main parts, Järve (Kohtla-Järve proper) and Ahtme, both with populations around 20,000, are located about 10 km apart. Several other settlements in north-eastern Ida-Viru county, connected to oil shale mining, are administered as districts of Kohtla-Järve. During most of the period of the Soviet occupation, the town of Jõhvi was also incorporated into Kohtla-Järve.

History

The history of Kohtla-Järve is closely tied to the history of extraction of oil shale – the main mineral of Estonia.

There is evidence that a number of settlements existed on the territory of modern Kohtla-Järve since the High Middle Ages. In the Danish Land Book, Järve and Kukruse villages were first mentioned in 1241 by the names Jeruius and Kukarus respectively, and Sompa village in 1420 by the name Soenpe. Its German name was  Kochtel-Türpsal.

Local residents were aware of oil shale's flammable capability in ancient times, but its industrial extraction in Estonia began only in the 20th century. In 1916, researches showed that oil shale could be used both as fuel and as a raw material for chemical industry, and mining started near Järve village. In 1919, the Estonian State Oil Shale Industrial Corporation was formed and extraction by shaft and open-pit mining was extended. Settlements for workers began to appear adjacent to the mines. In 1924 the oil shale processing factory was built near Kohtla railway station, and the nearby settlement, named Kohtla-Järve, started to grow.

During World War II the value of the Estonian oil shale deposit grew. The Germans, who occupied Estonia in 1941–1944, considered it as an important source of fuel. However, they failed to begin full-scale extraction.

After the war, the next occupier of Estonia, the Soviet Union, required constantly increasing quantities of oil shale for its industries and extraction greatly expanded. Kohtla-Järve, as the main settlement in the mining area, received city status on 15 June 1946. Since that time, during the next twenty years, there was a process of administrative amalgamation of neighboring settlements within the limits of Kohtla-Järve. Kohtla and Kukruse were added to the city in 1949; Jõhvi, Ahtme and Sompa in 1960. The town of Kiviõli and the boroughs of Oru, Püssi and Viivikonna were subordinated to the city in 1964. Thus, Kohtla-Järve greatly expanded, becoming a city with a unique layout, as its parts remained scattered among woods, agricultural areas and oil shale mines. Total population of the city increased mainly by workers sent from different parts of Soviet Union, reaching (with subordinated settlements) 90,000 in 1980.

After the end of the Soviet Union occupation, Estonia regained independence in August 1991, and thereafter the number of city districts decreased, as Jõhvi, Kiviõli and Püssi became officially separate towns. The volume of oil shale extraction and processing decreased dramatically during the 1990s, and many Kohtla-Järve citizens moved to Tallinn or Russia, due to high unemployment in Ida-Viru County.

Religion

Economy
Kohtla-Järve is known for its chemical industry. It is the headquarters of Viru Keemia Grupp, an Estonian holding group of oil shale industry, power generation, and public utility companies. Eastman Chemical Company also has a manufacturing site located in Kohtla-Järve.

Since 2006, the Ukrainian DF Group has owned a fertilizer plant in Kohtla-Järve – it has (through its Austria and Cyprus based intermediaries) 100% ownership of AS Nitrofert. Established in 1993, AS Nitrofert was (as of 2006) the only plant to produce fertilizers in Estonia and during the peak of its production used 25% of the total volume of natural gas in Estonia.

Geography

Kohtla-Järve has a unique layout. The districts of the city are scattered across the northern part of Ida-Viru County in a considerably large area. The distance between Järve and Oru districts is about 20 km.

Districts
The city is subdivided into five administrative districts:

The populations of many of the smaller exclaves have rapidly declined since the 1990s. Before the Estonian administrative reform of 2017, Viivikonna and Sirgala (combined population of 99) were also part of the municipality.

Gallery

Twin towns – sister cities

Kohtla-Järve is twinned with:

 Kėdainiai, Lithuania
 Kingiseppsky District, Russia
 Korostyshiv, Ukraine
 Norderstedt, Germany
 Outokumpu, Finland
 Salihorsk, Belarus

 Slantsevsky District, Russia
 Staffanstorp, Sweden
 Veliky Novgorod, Russia
 Wyszków, Poland

See also
Ahtme Power Plant
Kohtla-Järve Power Plant
Viru Keemia Grupp

References

External links

Official website 
History and demographic information of the town

 
Cities and towns in Estonia
Municipalities of Estonia
Populated places in Ida-Viru County
Populated places established in 1924
1924 establishments in Estonia
Mining communities in Europe
Oil shale in Estonia
Petroleum in Estonia
Russian communities